Seze (or Sezo) is an Afro-Asiatic Omotic language, spoken in the western part of Ethiopia, near the town of Begi and just north of the Hozo-speaking community.

References

Languages of Ethiopia
Omotic languages
Mao languages